Judge Lawrence may refer to:

Alexander Atkinson Lawrence Jr. (1906–1979), judge of the United States District Court for the Southern District of Georgia
Anthony Lawrence (judge) (born 1965), judge of the Mississippi Court of Appeals
Charles Drummond Lawrence (1878–1975), judge of the United States Customs Court
Geoffrey Lawrence, 1st Baron Oaksey (1880–1971), British judge in the Nuremberberg trials
Philip Kissick Lawrence (c. 1793–1841), judge of the United States District Courts for the Eastern and Western Districts of Louisiana
William T. Lawrence (judge) (born 1947), judge of the United States District Court for the Southern District of Indiana

See also
Justice Lawrence (disambiguation)